is a Japanese voice actress and J-pop singer from Kanagawa Prefecture who released various solo CD albums. She is employed by 81 Produce.

Filmography

Anime

Iczer Reborn (1990 OVA), Nagisa Kasumi
The Brave Fighter of Legend Da-Garn (1992 TV), Hotaru Sakurakoji
Hime-chan's Ribbon (1992 TV), Aiko Nonohara
YuYu Hakusho (1992 TV), Yukina, Pu
Kouryu Densetsu Villgust (1992 OVA), Remi
Please Save My Earth (1993 OVA), Alice Sakaguchi
Mega Man: Upon a Star (1993 OVA), Akane Kobayashi
Tonde Burin (1994 TV), Karin Kokubu
Magic Knight Rayearth (1994 TV), Mokona, Primera
Hyper Doll (1995 OVA), Shoko
Iczer Girl Iczelion (1995 OVA), Nagisa Kai
Megami Paradise (1995 OVA), Lilith
Twin Signal (1996 OVA), Elara
Rurouni Kenshin (January 10, 1996 TV), Sanjō Tsubame
Saber Marionette J (1996 TV), Cherry
Revolutionary Girl Utena (1997 TV), Nanami Kiryu
Berserk (1997 TV), Princess Charlotte
Pokémon (1997 TV), Fūko, Tsutsuji, Izuna, Namiko, Azumi
Popolocrois (October 4, 1998 TV), Narcia/Kai
Monster Rancher (1999 TV), Mocchi
Candidate for Goddess (2000 TV), Tune Youg
Boys Be (2000  TV), Aki Mizutani
Love Hina (2000 TV), Mei Narusegawa
Angelic Layer (2001 TV), Hatoko Kobayashi
Princess Tutu (2002 TV), Lilie
Inuyasha (2002 TV), Koume
Sonic X (2003 TV), Maria Robotnik
Negima!: Magister Negi Magi (2004 OVA), Sayo Aisaka
Fushigiboshi no Futago Hime Gyu! (2005 TV), Bibin
Karin (2005 TV), Elda Marker
The Melancholy of Haruhi Suzumiya (2006 TV), Emiri Kimidori 
Negima!? (2006 TV), Sayo Aisaka 
Kirarin Revolution (2007 TV),  - Misaki Shirahama
Neo Angelique (2008 OVA), Angelique
Kamisama Minarai: Himitsu no Cocotama (2016 TV), Paline, Akane Saionji, Charlotte
UQ Holder! (2017 TV), Sayo Aisaka

Video games
Astal (1995, Sega Saturn) Leda
Variable Geo (1993 PC), Kaori Yanase
Ace Combat 3: Electrosphere (1999 PS), Rena Hirose
Valkyrie Profile (1999 PS), Shiho
PopoloCrois Story II (2000 PS/), Narcia/Kai
Sonic Adventure 2 (2001 Dreamcast), Maria Robotnik
Super Robot Wars MX (2004 PS2), Aqua Centolm
Shadow the Hedgehog (2005 GC, PS2, Xbox), Maria Robotnik
Return to PopoloCrois: A Story of Seasons Fairytale (2015 3DS), Narcia
PopoloCrois Story Narcia's Tears and the Fairy's Flute (2018 Android/iOS/), Narcia

Films
Doki Doki Wildcat Engine (2000), Robin
Slayers Premium (2001), Ruma
Pokémon Ranger and the Temple of the Sea (2006), Manaphy

Voice over (dubbing)

The Raccoons (1985 animated TV), Lisa Raccoon (Japanese dub) – also in French
Thomas and the Magic Railroad (2000 film), Young Tasha (Laura Bower)
Hot Wheels World Race (2003 animated film), Gelorum
Hot Wheels AcceleRacers (2005 animated film), Gelorum

References

 Book references
 Maeda, Hisashi. "The Official Art of The Melancholy of Haruhi Suzumiya". (November 2007) Newtype USA. pp. 133–139.

External links
  
  
 Yuri Shiratori at GamePlaza-Haruka Voice Acting Database 
 Yuri Shiratori at Hitoshi Doi's Seiyuu Database

1968 births
Living people
Japanese voice actresses
Japanese women singers
People from Kanagawa Prefecture
Musicians from Kanagawa Prefecture